Michel Luneau (30 January 1934 – 19 July 2012) was a French poet, writer, publisher from Brittany. Also a gallerist, from 1998 he directed the centre for contemporary art of la Rairie at Pont-Saint-Martin.

Bibliography 
Le Mal vivant, Sylvain Chiffoleau, 1956
Solitude à plusieurs voix pour une mort naturelle (poèmes, tirage réservé), 1976
O Positif (poèmes), Saint-Germain-des-prés, 1977 
O Positif (recueil orné par Antoni Guansé), Saint-Germain-des-prés, 1977 
La Nuit des autres, Saint-Germain-des-prés, collection Théâtre, 1977 
Mort à vivre, illustré par Alix Axthausen, Saint-Germain-des-prés, 1978
Le Cantique des organes, Saint-Germain-des-prés, 1978 
La Maison du poète, Saint-Germain-des-prés/Armand Colin, collection "L'enfant, la Poésie", 1979 
Douceur du sang, illustré par Alix Axthausen, Saint-Germain-des-prés, 1980
Le Mémorial du sang, Éditions Grasset, 1981  
Folle-alliée (roman), Grasset, 1982 (Prix Sainte-Beuve) 
Chroniques de la vie d'en dessous (roman), Grasset, 1984 
Sexe-je, Grasset, 1986 
La Légende du corps (roman), François Bourin, 1989 
L'Autredi (roman), François Bourin, 1990 (Prix du roman de la Société des gens de lettres, Prix le Procope, Avoriaz 1991) 
Paroles d'arbre, Julliard, 1994 
Gabriel, archange (roman), Flammarion, 1996 (Prix de la ville de Nantes) 
Rouge profond (poèmes), Peintures de Tony Soulié, Climats, 1999 
Voiture 13, place 64 (roman), Verticales, 2000 (Prix de l'Ouest) 
Minimales et Maximiennes (recueil d'aphorismes), collages de Thierry Renard, Climats, 2002 
La Rairie dans tout son état, Gallimard, 2003 
Paroles d'arbre (extraits), édition illustrée par Tony Soulié, Climats, 2003 
L'Œil excessif : Entre Loire et Océan, illustré par Tony Soulié, Joca Seria, 2004 
Euphorismes (aphorismes), Joca Seria, 2004 
Avis de passage (roman), Joca Seria, 2005 
Transmission de pensées (aphorismes), Joca Seria, 2006 
Juste avant d'écrire (roman), Joca Seria, 2007 
Antonin, chambre 409 (poèmes pour enfants), illustrations de Michel Jouët, Joca Seria, 2009  
La séparation de corps, suivi de Règles de trois, illustration Tony Soulié, Joca Seria, 2009 
Pour l'amour des mots (euphorismes), Joca Seria, 2010 
L'adieu aux arbres et aux oiseaux (roman), poèmes et collages de Thierry Renard, Joca Seria, 2011 
 À vol d'oiseau (poème)

References

External links 
 Les aphorismes de Michel Luneau sur le site Francopolis
 Michel Luneau participant à la célèbre émission Apostrophes de Bernard Pivot

20th-century French poets
21st-century French poets
21st-century French male writers
Prix Sainte-Beuve winners
Poets from Brittany
Writers from Brittany
1934 births
2012 deaths
20th-century French male writers